The Okavango River (formerly spelled Okovango or Okovanggo), also known as the Cubango River, is a river in southwest Africa. Farther south, it forms part of the border between Angola and Namibia, and then flows into Botswana. The Okavango does not have an outlet to the sea. Instead, it discharges into the Okavango Delta or Okavango Alluvial Fan, in an endorheic basin in the Kalahari Desert.

Flow 

In Angola, the upper reaches of the Cuito (a tributary river to the Okavango) suffers clogging due to controlled burns of the vegetation, reducing water flow downstream as the accumulated water instead flows into the sand.

Before it enters Botswana, the river drops 4 m in a series of rapids known as Popa Falls, visible when the river is low, as during the dry season.

In the rainy season, an outflow to the Boteti River in turn seasonally discharges to the Makgadikgadi Pans, which features an expansive area of rainy-season wetland where tens of thousands of flamingos congregate each summer. Part of the river's flow fills Lake Ngami. Noted for its wildlife, the Okavango area contains Botswana's Moremi Game Reserve.

Flood 

Every wet season, Angola receives three times more rainfall than Botswana, discharging a higher than usual flow into the Okavango, turning swathes of outlying desert into a huge wetland.

Although the summer rains fall in Angola in January, they take a whole month to travel the first 1,000 km of the Okavango River, and then they take a further four months to filter through the plants and numerous channels of the final 250 km of the delta. As a result, the flood is at its biggest sometime between June and August, during Botswana's dry winter months. The delta then swells to three times its permanent size, attracting animals from kilometres around and creating one of Africa's greatest concentrations of wildlife.

At its widest point in a big flood year, the seasonal swamp stretches to 150 km across from east to west; one of the factors that leads to the ever-changing nature of the delta is the flatness of the area. If one were to take a cross section of the delta at its widest point, one would find that the height variation from the mean over that 150 km is less than 2 m, which means that a minor sand deposition can cause major changes.

In very wet years, a part of the river's flow may extend along the Magweggana River (actually a northeastern distributary of the Okavango Delta) and enter the Zambezi River, bypassing the Kalahari.

Sediment transport 
The river carries annually  28,000 tonnes of suspended sediment and a similar amount of bedload to the terminal swamps. Most of the particulate sediment carried by the river is fine sand, with some silt and mud, thanks to the geological makeup of the Okavango River catchment which is largely underlain by Kalahari sand. There is low concentration of  dissolved solids in the river water - around 40 mg/L, made up mostly of silica, calcium and magnesium bicarbonates - but these dissolved solids form the largest component of sediment carried into the delta because the annual water volume is so large.

History 
During colder periods in Earth's history, a part of the Kalahari was a massive lake, known as Lake Makgadikgadi. In this time, the Okavango would have been one of its largest tributaries.

Water conflict 
Both Namibia and Botswana experience drought, and as a result, concerns have been expressed about possible conflict over use of the river's water. Namibia has built a water canal, measuring about 300 km long, and has proposed a project to build a 250 km pipeline to divert water from the river into Namibia to help relieve the drought.

Botswana, however, uses the Okavango Delta for both tourism income and a water source. The Department of Water Affairs in Botswana has submitted that 97% of the water in the river is lost through evaporation, so the country cannot afford to lose any extra water.

Namibia, in turn, has argued that it will only divert half of one percent of the river's flow, and that it is entitled to any water that flows through its territory. To deal with such issues, in September 1994, Angola, Namibia, and Botswana signed an agreement to form the Permanent Okavango River Basin Water Commission, to provide advice to the three countries about the best ways to share the Okavango River's resources.

References

External links 

 OKACOM Homepage

Rivers of Angola
Rivers of Namibia
Rivers of Botswana
International rivers of Africa
Kalahari Desert
Angola–Namibia border
Water conflicts
Border rivers